Lucas Wolf may refer to:
 Lucas Wolf (racing driver), German racing driver
 Lucas Wolf (footballer), German footballer

See also
 Lucas Wolfe, American racing driver